John Frederick Nye (26 February 1923 – 8 January 2019) was a British physicist and glaciologist. He was the first to apply plasticity to understand glacier flow.

Career 
His early work was on the physics of plasticity, spanning ice rheology, ice flow mechanics, laboratory ice flow measurements, glacier surges, meltwater penetration in ice, and response of glaciers and ice sheets to seasonal and climatic changes. Later in his long career, he worked extensively in optics, publishing his last paper on electromagnetic wave polarization only a few days before his death.

He was elected a Fellow of the Royal Society in 1976. He served as president of the International Glaciological Society (1966–9), who awarded him the Seligman Crystal in 1969 for outstanding contributions to glaciology. He was also president of the International Commission of Snow and Ice of the International Association of Hydrological Sciences (1971–5). The Cryosphere Focus Group of the American Geophysical Union hosts a Nye Lecture each year at its fall meeting.

Awards and recognition 
Nye won the Chree medal and prize in 1989. He was Emeritus Professor in Physics at the University of Bristol, UK. In addition to glaciology, his research interests included caustics and microwave probes.

Nye died on 8 January 2019 at age 95 from heart failure.

Books
 J.F. Nye, 1957, Physical Properties of Crystals: Their Representation by Tensors and Matrices. Oxford University Press. 
 J.F. Nye, 1999, Natural Focusing and Fine Structure of Light: Caustics and Wave Dislocations. CRC Press.

Scientific publications
1951, The flow of glaciers and ice-sheets as a problem in plasticity. Proceedings of the Royal Society of London Series A-Mathematical And Physical Sciences, 207(1091),554-572.
1952, The mechanics of glacier flow. J. Glaciol. 2 (1952), pp. 82–93
1953, The flow law of ice from measurements in glacier tunnels, laboratory experiments and the Jungfraufirn Borehole Experiment. Proceedings of the Royal Society of London Series A-Mathematical And Physical Sciences, 219(1139), 477–489.
1958, Surges in Glaciers, Nature 181, 1450–1451
1959. The motion of ice sheets and glaciers. J. Glaciol., 3(26), 493–507.

See also
Nye Glacier
Nye notation
N-channel
Ice-sheet dynamics
Bubble raft

References

External links 
 Homepage at the University of Bristol
 Listen to an oral history interview with John Nye - a life story interview recorded for An Oral History of British Science at the British Library

1923 births
2019 deaths
British glaciologists
English physicists
Academics of the University of Bristol
Fellows of the Royal Society
Members of the Royal Swedish Academy of Sciences